Metarctia rubribasa is a moth of the subfamily Arctiinae. It was described by George Thomas Bethune-Baker in 1911. It is found in Angola and the Democratic Republic of the Congo.

References

 Natural History Museum Lepidoptera generic names catalog

Metarctia
Moths described in 1911